Clarendon Park is a settlement in Clarendon Parish in south-central Jamaica.

It is the birthplace of Sandie Richards, a track and field bronze medal winner at the 2004 Summer Olympics.

Transport 
Clarendon Park used to be served by a railway station on the national railway network.

References 

Populated places in Clarendon Parish, Jamaica